Arkansas Federal Credit Union is a federally chartered credit union headquartered in Jacksonville, Arkansas, and regulated under the authority of the National Credit Union Administration (NCUA). Arkansas Federal is the largest credit union in Arkansas. As of 2018, Arkansas Federal had over $1 billion in assets, with more than 98,000 members, and 14 branch locations.

Eligibility for membership is extended to all Arkansans. Member deposits are insured up to $500,000 ($250K through NCUA and $250k through Excess Share Insurance).

Arkansas Federal Credit Union strives to give back to our member communities. Since 1998, Arkansas Federal has contributed over $1 million to the Arkansas Children's Hospital.

External links
 Official website

Credit unions based in Arkansas
Jacksonville, Arkansas
1956 establishments in Arkansas
Banks established in 1956